The 2001–02 Biathlon World Cup was a multi-race tournament over a season of biathlon, organised by the International Biathlon Union. The season started on 6 December 2001 in Hochfilzen, Austria, and ended on 24 March 2002 in Holmenkollen, Norway. It was the 25th season of the Biathlon World Cup.

Calendar
Below is the IBU World Cup calendar for the 2001–02 season.

World Cup Podium

Men

Women

Men's team

Women's team

Standings: Men

Overall 

Final standings after 24 races.

Individual 

Final standings after 4 races.

Sprint 

Final standings after 8 races.

Pursuit 

Final standings after 9 races.

Mass Start 

Final standings after 4 races.

Relay 

Final standings after 6 races.

Nation 

Final standings after 18 races.

Standings: Women

Overall 

Final standings after 24 races.

Individual 

Final standings after 4 races.

Sprint 

Final standings after 8 races.

Pursuit 

Final standings after 9 races.

Mass Start 

Final standings after 4 races.

Relay 

Final standings after 6 races.

Nation 

Final standings after 18 races.

Medal table

Achievements
First World Cup career victory
, 25, in his 2nd season — the WC 3 Sprint in Brezno-Osrblie; it also was his first podium
, 27, in her 9th season — the WC 3 Sprint in Brezno-Osrblie; first podium was 2001–02 Individual in Brezno-Osrblie
, 25, in his 3rd season — the WC 6 Individual in Antholz-Anterselva; it also was his first podium
, 26, in her 3rd season — the Olympic Pursuit in Salt Lake City; first podium was 1999–2000 Sprint in Ruhpolding
, 28, in her 7th season — the WC 8 Sprint in Lahti; first podium was 1995–96 Individual in Pokljuka

First World Cup podium
, 24, in his 4th season — no. 3 in the WC 2 Individual in Pokljuka
, 27, in her 9th season — no. 3 in the WC 3 Individual in Brezno-Osrblie
, 23, in his 4th season — no. 2 in the WC 3 Mass Start in Brezno-Osrblie
, 25, in his 2nd season — no. 2 in the WC 5 Sprint in Ruhpolding
, 22, in his 3rd season — no. 3 in the WC 6 Individual in Antholz-Anterselva
, 22, in her 3rd season — no. 3 in the WC 6 Pursuit in Antholz-Anterselva
, 25, in her 7th season — no. 3 in the WC 8 Pursuit in Lahti
, 24, in her 3rd season — no. 3 in the World Championships Mass Start in Holmenkollen

Victory in this World Cup (all-time number of victories in parentheses)

Men
 , 7 (21) first places
 , 5 (27) first places
 , 4 (7) first places
 , 3 (22) first places
 , 2 (11) first places
 , 1 (3) first place
 , 1 (1) first place
 , 1 (1) first place

Women
 , 9 (42) first places
 , 6 (13) first places
 , 3 (3) first places
 , 2 (17) first places
 , 1 (3) first place
 , 1 (3) first place
 , 1 (1) first place
 , 1 (1) first place

Retirements
Following notable biathletes announced their retirement during or after the 2001–02 season:

References

External links
IBU official site

 
Biathlon World Cup
2001 in biathlon
2002 in biathlon